The Colombian weasel (Neogale felipei), also known as Don Felipe's weasel, is a very rare species of weasel only known with certainty from the departments of Huila and Cauca in Colombia and nearby northern Ecuador (where it is only known from a single specimen). Both its scientific and alternative common name honours the mammalogist Philip "Don Felipe" Hershkovitz.

There is extensive deforestation within its limited distribution within the northern Andes of Colombia and Ecuador, and with less than 10 known specimens, it is probably the rarest carnivoran in South America. It is considered vulnerable by the IUCN.

It is the second-smallest living carnivoran on average, being only slightly larger than the least weasel (Mustela nivalis) and slightly smaller than the stoat or ermine (M. erminea). The upperparts and tail are blackish-brown, while the underparts are orange-buff.

The species was formerly only known from specimens until the first photo of a living individual was taken in 2011 by an amateur naturalist who found one trapped in his parents' house; the weasel subsequently escaped to the outdoors. The image was uploaded to iNaturalist in 2018, where it gained widespread attention.

Taxonomy 
Originally described in the genus Mustela, a 2021 study reclassified into the genus Neogale along with 2 other former Mustela species, as well as the two species formerly classified in Neovison.

Description
N. felipei has a dark dorsal color with no variation, ventrally the weasel has a light orange color with gradual fading of color up to the head. Hair color from the tail to the nose is uniform with no striping or spotting. N. felipei has an inflated auditory bulla located near the dorsal midline on the body, along with a wide mesopterygoid fossa. The soles of the feet lack any fur, and extensive webbing is located on the second, third, and fourth digits, suggesting a semi-aquatic lifestyle.

Distribution and habitat
N. felipei is one of the least studied carnivore species in the Americas. Photos taken of a Colombian weasel by Juan de Roux are the first known photos of a living Colombian weasel. These tiny carnivores are thought to maintain a larger geographical range that currently known. Reports of sightings have placed N. felipei in the mountain ranges of western Colombia to northern Ecuador. N. felipei was originally thought to be endemic to Colombia however recent specimens have been collected in Ecuador that have since proven this thought wrong. Distribution and habitat modeling surveys have been able to predict that N. felipei is distributed between 20 protected areas in Colombia, and 14 in Ecuador along with three previously known locations in both countries, the majority of these locations lie in protected areas of the forest.

From geographic modeling, and collected specimens it has been concluded that Neogale felipei lives in largely riparian habitats, primarily staying close to rivers, streams, and along the shorelines of other natural water sources. Since this habitat lies in an elevation range of  it is classified as being in a "cloud forest" consisting of 100% humidity adding to the riparian habitat.

Diet
N. felipei is a carnivorous mammal that preys primarily on fish, other small aquatic animals, and small terrestrial mammals. Hunting is aided by the use of webbed feet and camouflaged fur.

Conservation status
Neogale felipei has been recognized by the IUCN as being vulnerable and having a decreasing population. However, due to rarity of sighting, and deforestation of known habitat it remains unclear as to the true numbers of individuals that make up the population.

References

Bibliography 
 Izor, R. J. and N. E. Peterson. 1985. Notes on South American weasels. Journal of Mammalogy 66: 788–790. 
 Burneo, S., José F. González-Maya, and D. Tirira. "Distribution and habitat modelling for Colombian Weasel Mustela felipei in the Northern Andes." Small Carnivore Conservation 41 (2009): 41–45.
 Martínez-Arias, Víctor M. "Has Colombian Weasel Mustela felipei been overlooked in collections?" Héctor E. Ramírez-Chaves. Small Carnivore Conservation 47 (2012): 30–34.
 Tirira, Diego G., and José F. González-Maya. "Current state of knowledge of the least-known carnivore in South America: Colombian Weasel Mustela felipei in Colombia and Ecuador." Small Carnivore Conservation 41 (2009): 46–50.
 Loyola, R. D., De Oliveira, G., Diniz-Filho, J. A. F. and Lewinsohn, T. M. (2008), "Conservation of Neotropical carnivores under different prioritization scenarios: mapping species traits to minimize conservation conflicts." Diversity and Distributions, 14: 949–960.  

Weasels
Carnivorans of South America
Endemic fauna of Colombia
Endemic fauna of Ecuador
Mammals of the Andes
Mammals of Colombia
Mammals of Ecuador
Vulnerable animals
Vulnerable biota of South America
Mammals described in 1978
Taxobox binomials not recognized by IUCN